The ninth season of New Zealand reality television series The Block NZ premiered on 14 June 2021. It is set in the Auckland suburb of Point Chevalier.

The judges are Chris Stevens, Ann-Louise Hyde, and Lauren Mirabito. The hosts are Mark Richardson and former judge Shelly Ferguson and the site foreman is Peter Wolfkamp.

The winning team won $100,000 on top of their auction profit.

Production

In December 2019, a casting call was sent out looking for four new teams. Production for this season began in January 2020 on Huia Road in Point Chevalier with four two-storey townhouses being constructed. However, due to the COVID-19 pandemic and restrictions put in place, the season was postponed until 2021, with production pausing on 23 March 2020, at the start of the third week, and resuming on 19 April 2021.

Contestants 
The teams selected for this season are as follows. Connie replaced Janah Kingi as Rachel's teammate in week 3 when production resumed after it was suspended due to the COVID-19 pandemic. When Keegan's ribs were fractured during a challenge in week 7, the brother's sister Maddy Crawford temporarily joined Team Yellow to allow time for Keegan to heal.

Score history

Room reveal scores

 Colour key:
  Highest Score
  Lowest Score

Judges' scores

Challenge results

Auction results 
The final episode and live auctions were due to be held on September 5, however the date was deferred to 14 November due to COVID-19.

Notes

References 

2021 New Zealand television seasons